USNS Benjamin Isherwood (T-AO-191) was a  fleet replenishment oiler of the United States Navy. She was never completed.

Construction
Benjamin Isherwood, the fifth Henry J. Kaiser-class ship, was laid down by the Pennsylvania Shipbuilding Company in Philadelphia, Pennsylvania, on 12 July 1986. Her construction encountered numerous problems. Although she was launched on 15 August 1988, her construction contract with Pennsylvania Shipbuilding was cancelled on 31 August 1989. Along with her unfinished sister ship , the incomplete Benjamin Isherwood was towed to the Philadelphia Naval Shipyard in Philadelphia on 27 October 1989 for lay-up.

A new contract to complete Benjamin Isherwood was awarded on 16 November 1989 to the Tampa Shipbuilding Company of Tampa, Florida.  She was towed from Philadelphia to Tampa. She was christened there on 7 December 1991. However, construction problems continued, and that contract also was cancelled, on 15 August 1993, when the ship was 95.3 percent complete. Cost overruns had run into the millions of U.S. dollars.

Reserve
The Navy decided that completion of Benjamin Isherwood as an oiler was no longer necessary, and considered converting her into an ammunition ship, but the conversion was found to be cost-prohibitive. Instead, the nearly complete Benjamin Isherwood was turned over to the Maritime Administration and towed up the James River in Virginia, where she was placed in the National Defense Reserve Fleet as part of the United States Navy's James River Reserve Fleet at Lee Hall, Virginia. She was struck from the Navy List on 29 December 1997, and her title was transferred to the Maritime Administration on 1 February 1999. She and Henry Eckford were the only units of the 18-ship Henry J. Kaiser class not completed.

Scrapping
On 12 July 2011, the Benjamin Isherwood departed for Brownsville, Texas, to be recycled by International Shipbreaking Limited.

References

External links

 

Henry J. Kaiser-class oilers
Ships built in Philadelphia
Ships built in Tampa, Florida
Cancelled ships of the United States Navy
1988 ships
James River Reserve Fleet